The following is a list of Peabody Award winners and honorable mentions during the 1980s (1980–1989).

1980

1981

1982

1983

1984

1985

1986

1987

1988

1989

See also
Academy Award for Best Documentary Feature
Alfred I. duPont-Columbia University Award

References

 List1980